Spiritual communion is a Christian practice of desiring union with Jesus Christ in the Eucharist. It is used as a preparation for Mass and by individuals who cannot receive holy communion.

This practice is well established in Lutheran, Anglican, and Methodist churches, as well as in the Catholic Church, where it has been highly recommended by many saints, according to Pope John Paul II. He explained that practicing this constant desire for Jesus in the Eucharist is rooted in the ultimate perfection of eucharistic communion, which is the ultimate goal of every human desire.

The practice of spiritual communion has been especially used by Christians in times of persecution, such as during the era of state atheism in the Eastern Bloc, as well as in times of plagues, such as during the current COVID-19 pandemic, when many Christians are unable to attend Mass, and therefore not able to receive the Eucharist on the Lord's Day.

Doctrine

Thomas Aquinas defined spiritual communion as "an ardent desire to receive Jesus in the Holy Sacrament and a loving embrace as though we had already received Him."<ref>Costa, F. D. (1958). Nature and effects of spiritual communion, Proceedings of the Catholic Theological Society of America''', 140.</ref> The basis of this practice was explained by Pope John Paul II in his encyclical, Ecclesia de Eucharistia:

Thus, the passionate desire for God, whom the saints have seen as the Sole Satisfier, and who in the Eucharist is the "summit and source of the Christian life", is at the root of this practice. The experience of Padre Pio illustrates the compelling desire felt by the saints in the face of the  drawing and attracting power of God's love: 

Jean-Marie Vianney compared spiritual communion to blowing on fire and embers that are starting to go out in order to make them burn again: 

Josemaría Escrivá taught spiritual communions improve presence of God: "What a source of grace there is in spiritual Communion! Practise it frequently and you'll have more presence of God and closer union with him in your life." He also taught: "Do not neglect to say, 'Jesus, I love you', and make one spiritual communion, at least, each day, in atonement for all the profanations and sacrileges he suffers because he wants to be with us."

According to Catholic theologians, the value of a spiritual can be as great as Holy Communion itself. Stefano Manelli wrote, 

The Church of England, mother church of the Anglican Communion, teaches with regard to spiritual communion that "Believers who cannot physically receive the sacrament are to be assured that they are partakers by faith of the body and blood of Christ and of the benefits he conveys to us by them."

The Methodist Church in Great Britain teaches that "Spiritual Communion is a practice where we entrust ourselves to God in prayer, pledging ourselves to God once more as disciples and praying that God might give us spiritually the same grace we share when we physically receive Holy Communion." The practice is consistent with Methodist theology, which holds that God can impart grace "with or without physical means: God can work through anything or indeed nothing."

Examples

According to the official Catholic handbook (enchiridion) for indulgences, "an Act of Spiritual Communion, according to any pious formula, is enriched with a partial indulgence."

It also specifically mentions this Act of Spiritual Communion, which was recommended by Alphonsus Liguori:

Cardinal Rafael Merry del Val composed this spiritual communion:

 
Another example is:

Piarist fathers have taught this short act of spiritual communion, popularized by Josemaría Escrivá:

Prayers taken from the A Form of Spiritual Communion'' of the Diocese of Malaita of the Anglican Communion are as follows:

Mitchell Lewis, a Methodist elder, authored an act of spiritual communion for use in the Methodist tradition:

St. Stephen Evangelical Lutheran Church, a congregation of the Evangelical Lutheran Church in America in Pompano Beach, published the following act of spiritual communion:

Usage

The practice of spiritual communion is used by Christians, especially Lutherans, Catholics, Anglicans and Methodists, when they have been unable to receive the Holy Communion, especially in times of sickness and during persecution by states hostile towards religion. Anglican priest Jonathan Warren Pagán cited the joy Walter Ciszek experienced by making spiritual communion during the era of state atheism in the Soviet Union that resulted in the persecution of Christians in the Eastern Bloc.

Referencing theology related to the Body of Christ and the real presence of Christ in the Eucharist, Anglican priest Jonathan Warren Pagán wrote that "Gathered worship in word and sacrament is therefore not an optional add-on for Christians" though the COVID-19 pandemic rendered it necessary to move to online formats for the common good. He encouraged the practice of spiritual communion amidst the pandemic, especially during the Anglican service of morning prayer. Pope Francis also suggested that the faithful say spiritual communion prayers during the COVID-19 pandemic, which renewed interest in the practice; Methodist clergy have also encouraged spiritual communion.

See also

 Sacrament of Penance

References

External links
EWTN on spiritual communion
Catholic United for the Faith
Two hearts network
Our Catholic prayers
Bishop Roman Danylak, Eastern Catholic Church (Ukraine)
The Spiritual Combat 
Spiritual Communion - Methodist Church in Great Britain

Catholic spirituality
Christian prayer
Roman Catholic prayers
Lutheran liturgy and worship
Methodism
Anglicanism

it:Eucaristia#Comunione spirituale